NOW: Pensions is the 3rd biggest master trust in the UK serving over 1.7 million employees.

History
The Pensions Act 2008 established new duties which require employers to automatically enrol eligible workers into a workplace pension plan that meets certain minimum standards. NOW: Pensions was set up by ATP of Denmark for employers requiring a scheme to fulfil their duties under the Act.
ATP launched Now:Pensions in early 2012, Morten Nilsson was headed the group as CEO. 

During the three years leading up to June 30, 2017 Now:Pensions achieved a 2.8 percent annualized return, which was significantly less than the returns achieved by almost all of its competitors during the same time.

In November 2017 the Pensions Regulator fined the trustees of Now:Pensions £50,000 for administration problems. Followed by a fine for £20,000 in February 2018.

In February 2019 The Cardano Group acquired Now:Pensions from ATP after Now:Pensions ran into multiple administration problems and years of poor performance.

See also
 Pensions in the United Kingdom
 The Pensions Regulator
 National Employment Savings Trust
 The People's Pension

References

External links
 NOW: Pensions' website
 Details about automatic enrolment on the webpage of The Pensions Advisory Service (TPAS)
 Link to the UK Government web page covering the consultations on plans to apply a charge cap of 0.75% of funds under management on default funds of DC pension schemes from April 2015
 The Pension Regulator’s code of practice for DC schemes on the TPR website
 Link to UK Government web page announcing five millionth person to be automatically enrolled

Pensions in the United Kingdom